Maura McGiveney (February 28, 1939 – November 10, 1990) was an English-American film and television actress during the 1960s and 1970s. She appeared several times in such TV series as Hawaii Five-0 and Perry Mason, The Virginian ("Day of the Scorpion"), Straightaway, The Hollywood Palace, Adam-12, McHale's Navy, My Three Sons, Peter Gunn, The Fugitive, The Flying Nun, Death Valley Days, and Dr. Kildare.

She was born February 28, 1939, in Stockport, England, UK and died November 10, 1990, of cirrhosis of the liver in Sherman Oaks, California. Born Mary Alish McGiveney She was the daughter of the  "quick change" actor Owen McGiveney and Elizabeth Hughes. She studied at the Royal Academy of Dramatic Arts and first came to Hollywood to work in film.

Career
McGiveney earned a Golden Globe nomination from the Hollywood Foreign Press Association as Most Promising Newcomer of 1966 for her role as Claire Hackett in the farce Do Not Disturb with Doris Day and Rod Taylor. She was also in the films Twist Around the Clock with Chubby Checker, W.I.A. Wounded in Action", Once You Kiss a Stranger and Destination America. On stage she appeared in Harvey, The Second City and The Fantasticks, among many other productions.

McGiveney was a comedian and singer as well as an actress. In what she hoped would be her ticket to fame, she appeared in a program similar to the successful TV show Laugh-In titled Turn-On. Turn on's sole episode aired on February 5, 1969, with the curvaceous McGiveney as "The Body Politic". The rather sexually explicit theme, jokes and remarks of "Turn-On" led to ABC affiliates refusing to broadcast the second episode, and the sponsor Bristol-Myers immediately canceled it. Miss McGiveney expressed shock when the show was canceled, even though five shows were filmed and twenty-one more planned. She said "I still can't understand it. We were all so sure it was going to be a big hit"
McGiveney, an English-born character actress who appeared in dozens of TV series, died Saturday in Los Angeles after a battle with liver disease.

Filmography
North by Northwest (1959) - Attendant #2 (uncredited)
Twist Around the Clock (1961) - Debbie Marshall
Do Not Disturb (1965) - Claire Hackett
W.I.A. Wounded in Action (1966) - Lt. Marietta Dodd
Once You Kiss a Stranger (1969) - Harriet Parker

References

External links 
 

English television actresses
1939 births
1990 deaths
English film actresses
20th-century English actresses
People from Stockport
Deaths from cirrhosis